Atos is a French multinational technology company headquartered in Bezons, France.

Atos may also refer to:
 American Theater Organ Society
 ATOS, the Autonomous Decentralized Transport Operation Control System, an computerized control system for train traffic
 Hyundai Atos, a city car produced by the Hyundai Motor Company
 Atos Wirtanen, an Ålandic-born former left-wing member of Finnish parliament
 A-I-R Atos, a range of rigid-wings made by A-I-R
 ATOS, a readability formula that is part of the Accelerated Reader software

For the former British Work Capability Assessment contractor, see Atos

See also

 Athos (disambiguation)
Antos (name)